The 1931 All England Championships was a badminton tournament held at the Royal Horticultural Hall, Westminster, England from March 3 to March 8, 1931.

Final results

Results

Men's singles

Women's singles

References

All England Open Badminton Championships
All England
All England Open Badminton Championships in London
1931 in badminton
March 1931 sports events
1931 sports events in London